is a Japanese business executive and former actor known for Choujin Sentai Jetman, Spy Sorge and Yume no onna. He is now retired from the entertainment industry. According to his Jetman co-star Toshihide Wakamatsu's blog, he has served as a director of an IT-related company.

Filmography

Film

TV series

Video

CM
 Nihon Keizai Shimbun
 English for you
 Mitsubishi Car Navigation System
 Sumitomo (S.H.I.) Construction Machinery
 Myojo Foods (Serial Ippei-chan)

References
 ^ A b c d "Japan Talent Directory '92" VIP Times, Inc., 1992, 183 pages.
 ^ A b "Japan Talent Directory 2002" VIP Times, Inc., 2002, 269 pages.
 ^ "Chōjin Sentai Jetman 2 Encyclopedia" 勁文Sha, 1992.
 ^ https://filmow.com/kotaro-tanaka-i-a348372/
 ^ http://themsfightinwords.blogspot.co.id/2013/06/imdb-inaccurate-movie-database.html

External links
 Official profile at Village 
 Official website in Kōtarō Tanaka 

Male actors from Kanagawa Prefecture
1964 births
Living people